Shaam News Network (Arabic: شبكة شام الإخبارية) (S.N.N.) is a Syrian opposition media outlet. It is named after the Arabic name for the Levant region. It was funded by Syrian-American activists at the beginning of the Syrian Revolution in 2011. It publishes videos, photos and articles by citizen journalists on its website and social media networks. It also publishes a newspaper called Shaam. Many international media used footage published by Shaam News Network, including Al Jazeera English, Associated Press, Al Arabiya, Al Aan TV, and Sky News Arabia.

References

External links 
 
 Twitter
 Facebook
 Youtube Channel

Mass media in Syria